The Welsh Chess Union is the national chess federation for Wales. Formed on 19 June 1954 as a Union of Associations in South Wales and Monmouthshire, it was originally a part of the British Chess Federation (BCF). The Union established the Welsh Championship in 1955. On 15 November 1969 it withdrew from the BCF to apply for membership in the World Chess Federation (FIDE) as an independent body. FIDE accepted the application at the Siegen Congress in 1970 and Wales competed in its first Olympiad at Skopje 1972, finishing 43rd of 62.

The Union comprises five county associations or "zones": Dyfed , East Glamorgan , Gwent , West Wales , and Chester & District Chess League .

Its objects are to promote, organise and regulate the playing of competitive chess throughout Wales. Its moto is "Ymosodiad Dewr; Amddiffyniad Sicr" - "Bold in Attack; In Defence Secure".

The President of the Union in 2014-19 was Bill Harle and the Executive Director is Mark Adams.

References

External links
 

Wales
Chess in Wales
Chess
1954 establishments in Wales
Sports organizations established in 1954
Chess organizations
1954 in chess